Route 150 is a -long north–south secondary highway in the northeast New Brunswick, Canada. The highway starts at Route 11 (exit 203) as a continuation of Principale Street from Tracadie. Route 150 parallels Route 11 northward and passes through Sainte-Rose and Losier Settlement before its terminus near Six Roads. Route 150 is a former alignment of Route 11, resulting from an extension of the Tracadie-Sheila Bypass.

See also

References

150
150